The 2022–23 Major Arena Soccer League season is the fifteenth season for the league. The regular season started on November 25, 2022, and is scheduled to end on April 2, 2023. Each team is scheduled to play a 24-game schedule.

Changes from 2021–22
Returning
Mesquite Outlaws
Monterrey Flash

Rebranded
Ontario Fury to Empire Strykers

On Hiatus
Rochester Lancers

Change in season format
On October 6, 2022, the MASL announced that teams will be divided into two conferences (Eastern, and Western).
On October 20, 2022, the MASL announced that the top five teams of each conference advance to the playoffs, with the fourth and fifth team of each conference playing a play-in game to advance to the quarterfinals.  Similar to last season, the quarterfinals, semifinals, and finals rounds will be a 2 game home and home series; if tied after 2 games, a 15 minute overtime period then, if necessary, a golden goal overtime period will follow the end of regulation of Game 2.

Standings
 
(Bold) Division Winner

Eastern Conference

Western Conference

2023 Ron Newman Cup

References

External links
MASL official website

 
Major Arena Soccer League
Major Arena Soccer League
Major Arena Soccer League seasons